KWOF (106.3 FM, "106.3 The Wolf") is a radio station licensed to serve the community of Waukomis, Oklahoma. The station is owned by Chisholm Trail Broadcasting Co and airs a classic country format.

The station was assigned the call sign KWEO by the Federal Communications Commission on August 17, 2018. The station changed its call sign to KWOF on October 19, 2018, prior to receiving its license.

References

External links
 Official Website
 

WOF (FM)
Radio stations established in 2018
2018 establishments in Oklahoma
Classic country radio stations in the United States
Garfield County, Oklahoma